Turismo can refer to:

 Tourism - in Italian, Spanish and Portuguese, turismo translates to tourism.
 Gran Turismo - endurance or long distance races, or the Gran Turismo series on PlayStation game consoles.
 Turismo - the name of a car in Grand Theft Auto: San Andreas, which resembles Ferrari F40. In Grand Theft Auto IV, it was based on a Ferrari 360 Modena
 Plymouth Turismo - a rebranded version of the Dodge Charger
 Turismo - a rock band from Kingston-upon-Hull, England